Black is an unincorporated community in Parmer County, Texas, United States.  It lies on U.S. Route 60. The settlement is named for F.W. Wilsey, who served as land commissioner handling the sale of former XIT Ranch lands from 1905–1909.

References

Parmer County, Texas